National Geographic is a Dutch free-to-cable television channel that features documentaries produced by the National Geographic Society. It features some programming similar to that on the Discovery such as nature, science, culture, and history documentaries. The channel launched in the Netherlands in 1998 and initially time shared with CNBC Europe. It was later launched worldwide including in Asia and the United States. Today, the channel is available in over 145 countries, seen in more than 160 million homes and in 25 languages.

History 
National Geographic Channel launched in the Netherlands on 1 July 1998. It replaced NBC Europe, formerly known as NBC Super Channel and Super Channel. At the start National Geographic Channel time shared with CNBC Europe. In 2006 NBCUniversal sold its 25% shares to the News Corporation but it took 3 years before National Geographic Channel became a 24 hours channel. On 1 December 2009 CNBC Europe ceased airing in the mornings.

On 14 November 2016, National Geographic Channel was rebranded as National Geographic, dropping the "Channel" from its name.

On 20 March 2019 The Walt Disney Company acquired 21st Century Fox, including Fox Networks Group Benelux.

National Geographic HD 
National Geographic HD is available in the Netherlands. It launched through CanalDigitaal on 11 April 2006, two months later followed by UPC Netherlands on 8 June 2006. Originally the HD version was not a simulcast of the standard definition version of the National Geographic Channel, with some of the content coming from Rush HD, however from 1 September 2011 National Geographic Channel HD became a simulcast.

Programming

See also 
National Geographic (magazine)
National Geographic (American TV channel)
National Geographic Society

References

External links 
 Official Website

Television channels in the Netherlands
Television channels and stations established in 1998
Television channels in Flanders
Television channels in Belgium